Tetsa River Provincial Park is a former provincial park in British Columbia, Canada. It is part of the larger Muskwa-Kechika Management Area.  It is located on the north side of the Tetsa River at the confluence of Mill Creek, and is on the Alaska Highway.

References

External links
Google street view of entrance to park

Former Provincial Parks of British Columbia
Canadian Rockies
Fort Nelson Country